CJGY-FM is a Canadian radio station that broadcasts a Christian format at 96.3 FM in Grande Prairie, Alberta.

History 
The station received approval in 2006 and launched on December 3, 2007 as 96.3 Shine FM. In 2012, the station was transferred to Grande Prairie Radio, Ltd., owned by Touch Canada Broadcasting co-partner Peter Teichroeb. In 2013, the station re-branded as 96.3 Reach FM, although no change in format was made.

On January 27, 2016, the station received CRTC approval to add new FM transmitters in Dawson Creek (96.7 MHz) and Fort St. John, British Columbia (97.1 MHz). The transmitters, which commenced broadcasting in Summer 2016, repeat the same programs as CJGY-FM, but with local inserts, including news, weather and community information.

In 2017, the station was sold to Golden West Broadcasting.

Rebroadcasters
CJGY-FM has the following rebroadcasters:

Former logos

References

External links
96.3 Reach FM
 

JGY
JGY
Radio stations established in 2007
2007 establishments in Alberta